Hiruka Fernando (born 30 September 1976) is a Sri Lankan cricketer. She played in 60 Women's One Day International (WODIS) and 4 Women's Twenty20 International (WT20Is) for Sri Lanka. She was the first woman to score 1,000 runs in ODIs for Sri Lanka.

References

1976 births
Living people
Sri Lankan women cricketers
Sri Lanka women One Day International cricketers
Sri Lanka women Twenty20 International cricketers
Sportspeople from Moratuwa